A gopher, also known as a "pocket gopher" (family Geomyidae), is a burrowing rodent native to North America and Central America.

Gopher may also refer to:

Nature
 Some species of ground squirrels (tribe Marmotini) of North America, particularly those formerly classified as Spermophilus, are informally referred to as "gophers"
 Gopher snake – common name of several species of genus Pituophis endemic to west or southwest of North America
 Gopher tortoise (genus Gopherus), distributed in North America
 Gopher wood, of unclear meaning, mentioned in the Bible as the building material for Noah's ark
 Gopher Plant or Paper Spurge (Euphorbia lathyris)

Entertainment
 Gophers!, a British children's television programme
 "Gopher", real name Burl Smith, a character on TV show The Love Boat
 Gopher (Winnie-the-Pooh), a character in Walt Disney's Winnie The Pooh franchise

Technology
 The SA-13 "Gopher", or 9K35 Strela-10, a Soviet surface-to-air missile system
 Gopher (protocol), an early distributed hypertext protocol
 Go gopher, a mascot of Go programming language
 Slang term for a mobility scooter

Other
 Minnesota, the "Gopher State"
 Minnesota Golden Gophers, University of Minnesota sports teams
 Gopher (train), a passenger train operated by the Great Northern Railway, USA
 Gopher (video game), an Atari 2600 game
 Gofer, also spelled "gopher", an errand-runner
 Gopher Gang, early 20th-century New York street gang

See also
 Gofer (disambiguation)
 Gaufre, French term for a flat cake similar to waffles